The Cisalpina Private Natural Heritage Reserve is a private natural heritage reserve in the state of Mato Grosso do Sul, Brazil.
It contains an area of marshland at the head of the reservoir of the Eng Sérgio Motta Dam on the Paraná River.

Location

The Cisalpina Private Natural Heritage Reserve (RPPN) is in the municipality of Brasilândia, Mato Grosso do Sul. 

The reserve is in the region where the Rio Verde and Paraná River converge, and contains a complex system of interconnected lagoons, streams and channels connected to the channel of the Paraná, which has shifted its bed to the east over time.
There are traces of old channels of the Paraná dating back 10,000 to 40,000 years. 
The terrain is gently undulating.
There are two important prehistoric archaeological sites.

History

The area once included the Fazenda Olímpia, which was acquired in the 1950s by the Grupo Cisalpina Agrícola S/A.
This in turn was acquired by CESP.
CESP also acquired the Fazenda Flórida.
These formed the Cisalpina/Flórida Complex.
The idea of converting the complex into a private natural heritage reserve was described by CESP in a document of 26 November 2003.
The reserve proper was limited to the land above the  waterline allowed for seasonal operation of the reservoir.

The Brazilian Institute of Environment and Renewable Natural Resources (IBAMA) began the process of analyzing the request on 7 June 2004.
The municipal chamber of Brasilândia approved creation of the reserve on 16 November 2005.
Land ownership is fully regularized, and the reserve's boundaries are surrounded.
As of 2016 the management plan was being completed.

Environment

The climate is hot and humid, with one to three dry months.
The reserve covers an extensive area of várzea that is periodically flooded in the rainy season. 
The circulation in the area was drastically changed when the reservoir of the Eng Sérgio Motta Dam filled, changing the equilibrium of the system.
As of 2012 the vegetation was still adapting to the new conditions of moisture.
The region had been slowly becoming drier, but is now returning to moister conditions.
The mix of cerrado species is probably changing due to the rise in the level of the groundwater.

The vegetation has a wide variety of species caused by climate and geomorphological changes during the Quaternary, the reserve's diverse environments and previous human occupation.
There are at least 95 plant species, 171 bird species, 25 species of terrestrial fauna, 44 species of fish.
Cactus plants are found some areas, probably remnants of an earlier climate. 
Use for farming and ranching introduced exotic species of grass.
In the drier parts there are plants of the cerrado and cerradão forests.
These areas are being partially reforested in a program that is also releasing native animals. The vegetation is still in the process of regenerating.
Fauna include marsh deer (Blastocerus dichotomus), maned wolf (Chrysocyon brachyurus), broad-snouted caiman (Caiman latirostris), giant anteater (Myrmecophaga tridactyla) and southern tamandua (Tamandua tetradactyla).

Sanitation in the municipality is poor.
The soil and groundwater are contaminated and untreated sewage flows via the Aviação and Bom Jardim channels into the reservoir.
Environmental crimes by local residents indicate a lack of awareness of the importance of the reserve.
The reserve would be part of the proposed Trinational Biodiversity Corridor, which aims to provide forest connections between conservation units in Brazil, Paraguay and Argentina in the Upper Paraná ecoregion.

Notes

Sources

Private natural heritage reserves of Brazil
Protected areas of Mato Grosso do Sul
2005 establishments in Brazil
Cerrado